Paolo Zantelli (died September 15, 2013) was an Italian F2 racing boat pilot, known for winning two gold European championships, and one silver and one bronze. Zantelli was considered Italy's leading expert of his sports category following a career in the UIM F2 division that spanned 17 years. Zantelli died in hospital at the age of 48, after his racing boat collided with another boat, leaving him underwater and unconscious. He remained underwater for several minutes before being pulled out by life guards. He was then rushed to a hospital in critical condition but soon died of his injuries.

References

2013 deaths
Sport deaths in Italy
Italian motorboat racers
Motorboat racers who died while racing
Year of birth missing